Bon Echo may refer to:
The development name for Firefox 2
Bon Echo Provincial Park in Ontario, Canada